Krumbiegel is a German surname. Notable people with the surname include:

Gustav Hermann Krumbiegel (1865–1956), German botanist
Martin Krumbiegel (born 1963), German tenor, musician and musicologist, brother of Sebastian
Paulina Krumbiegel (born 2000), German footballer 
Sebastian Krumbiegel (born 1966), German singer and musician, brother of Martin
Ulrike Krumbiegel (born 1961), German actress

German-language surnames
German toponymic surnames